Oakland is an unincorporated community in Morgan County, West Virginia. It is located along Virginia Line Road (County Route 8) north of Unger and south of Stotlers Crossroads. Oakland is connected to Valley Road (U.S. Highway 522) by County Route 28 (Oakland and Morton Grove Roads).

References

External links

Unincorporated communities in Morgan County, West Virginia
Unincorporated communities in West Virginia